Thomas Andrew Hemming Field (1859 – 27 October 1937) was a New Zealand politician of the Reform Party.

Early life and family
Field was born in Long Gully, Victoria, Australia, in 1859, the son of Thomas Field, who had migrated from Ireland to Sydney in 1845. The family emigrated to New Zealand in 1862, settling in Nelson, where Field attended Nelson College from 1871 to 1872. He married Jessie Black at Nelson on 24 May 1881, and they had two sons and two daughters. Their eldest son Arthur Nelson Field was a journalist and right-wing author.

In 1885, Field became one of the first cyclists to ride the length of New Zealand.

Wilkins and Field 
Field was managing director of Wilkins and Field Hardware in Nelson. The firm was founded by his father in 1866 in Westport, and became Wilkins and Field in 1880 when W.C. Wilkins joined the business in Nelson.

Political career 

He was first elected as a Nelson City Councillor in 1907 and served in that capacity for four years. He was deputy mayor in 1910, and Mayor of Nelson between 1911 and 1913. In 1911 Field defeated Thomas Pettit 1231 votes to 1047. Field did not stand in 1913.

He held the Nelson electorate for one parliamentary term, from 1914 to 1919, after defeating Harry Atmore in 1914, but Atmore won the seat back in 1919, and held it for 27 more years.

Field also served as a member of the Nelson Hospital Board, president of both the Nelson Chamber of Commerce and the Nelson Philosophical Institute, and a trustee of the Cawthron Institute. He died suddenly at his office in Nelson on 27 October 1937, and was buried at Wakapuaka Cemetery. He was survived by his wife and his four children.

See also
Politics of New Zealand

References

1859 births
1937 deaths
Reform Party (New Zealand) MPs
Mayors of Nelson, New Zealand
Deputy mayors of places in New Zealand
People educated at Nelson College
Unsuccessful candidates in the 1919 New Zealand general election
Members of the New Zealand House of Representatives
New Zealand MPs for South Island electorates
People from Bendigo
Australian emigrants to New Zealand
New Zealand people of Irish descent
Burials at Wakapuaka Cemetery
Nelson City Councillors
People associated with the Cawthron Institute
Members of district health boards in New Zealand